The American television sitcom The Big Bang Theory, created and executive produced by Chuck Lorre and Bill Prady, premiered on CBS on September 24, 2007, while the American comedy spin-off prequel television series Young Sheldon, created and executive produced by Lorre alongside Jim Parsons and Steven Molaro, premiered on CBS on September 25, 2017.

The Big Bang Theory initially centers on five characters: Leonard Hofstadter and Sheldon Cooper, two physicists and roommates; Penny, their neighbor who is a waitress and aspiring actress; and Leonard and Sheldon's friends and coworkers aerospace engineer Howard Wolowitz and astrophysicist Raj Koothrappali.

Over time, several supporting characters have been introduced and promoted to starring roles, including physicist Leslie Winkle, neuroscientist Amy Farrah Fowler, microbiologist Bernadette Rostenkowski-Wolowitz, comic book store proprietor and friend of the other characters Stuart Bloom. The series also features numerous supporting characters, each of whom plays a prominent role in a story arc. Included among them are parents of the main characters, their dates and their coworkers. Celebrities such as Stephen Hawking appear in cameo roles as themselves.

Young Sheldon initially centers on Sheldon Cooper at the age of nine, going to high school and living with his family in the fictional town of Medford, East Texas, Sheldon's mother, Mary; his father and the head football coach at Medford High, George Sr.; his twin sister, Missy; his older brother, George Jr.; and his grandmother, Constance "Connie" Tucker, also known as "Meemaw". The series also features numerous supporting characters, each of whom plays a prominent role in a story arc. Included among them are Sheldon's present and former classmates, their dates and coworkers, and those of his family. Celebrities such as Elon Musk appear in cameo roles as themselves. Jim Parsons, who portrays the adult Sheldon Cooper on The Big Bang Theory, narrates the series and serves as an executive producer.

Main characters

Cast table
  = Main cast (credited) 
  = Recurring cast (2+ episodes)
  = Guest cast (1 episode)

The Big Bang Theory main characters

Leonard

Leonard Leakey Hofstadter (portrayed by Johnny Galecki; seasons 1-12) is an experimental physicist with an IQ of 173. Originally from New Jersey, he received his PhD at age 24, spending at least some of his time at Princeton University. He shared an apartment in Pasadena with colleague and friend Dr. Sheldon Cooper for much of the series. Unlike his equally geeky friends, Leonard is interested and adept in building relationships with other people. Compared to his friends, he is relatively successful with women. Leonard comes from an accomplished family. His mother, Dr. Beverly Hofstadter, is a neuroscientist and world-renowned psychiatrist with whom he has a strained relationship. His sister is a medical researcher. His father, Dr. Alfred Hofstadter, is an anthropologist. And his brother Michael is a Harvard law professor. He and Penny date on and off throughout the series, eventually marrying and finding out that Penny is pregnant in the series finale. 

Leonard makes a brief non-speaking cameo as a child in the Season 2 finale of Young Sheldon; he was portrayed by Isaac Harger as a child.

Sheldon

Sheldon Lee Cooper (portrayed by Jim Parsons; seasons 1-12) is a theoretical physicist, possessing a B.S, M.S, M.A, Ph.D, Sc.D, I.Q. of 187, and eidetic memory. Born in East Texas, he was a child prodigy and received his PhD at age 16 from the California Institute of Technology. He is a cold, condescending, self-centered, and immature person but is rarely malicious. He is obsessed with routines and any disruptions distress him enormously. He shows signs of  obsessive–compulsive personality disorder, often shown through his compulsive need to knock three times on a door while saying the name of the person behind the door 3 times too and the superiority complex. Despite his lack of social graces, he does care about his friends and family. In seasons 1–9, he shares an apartment in Pasadena with friend and fellow physicist Dr. Leonard Hofstadter. From then after, he moves in with his girlfriend and eventual wife, Amy. It is revealed in Young Sheldon that they have kids too. 

His interest in science fiction and comic books borders on the extreme. He has a particular affinity for Spock from the Star Trek franchise. Although he has the tendency to take things literally, he is fond of occasionally telling a joke or playing a prank, which he typically punctuates with his trademark exclamation, "Bazinga!"

Penny

Kindhearted and outgoing, Penny (portrayed by Kaley Cuoco; seasons 1-12) is Leonard and Sheldon's neighbor across the hallway. Originally from a small town outside Omaha, Nebraska, she was a waitress and occasional bartender at the local Cheesecake Factory until season seven, and is an aspiring actress. Sheldon describes her as a "good-natured simpleton" and is critical of her dropping out of community college.

Initially, not much is known about Penny's family, but it is mentioned in the series that her father, Wyatt (portrayed by Keith Carradine,) raised her like a boy, her mother smoked marijuana while she was pregnant with her, her sister shot her husband while they were intoxicated, and her brother is a meth dealer. Her mother, Susan (Katey Sagal), and brother, Randall (Jack McBrayer), are finally seen in the first episode of season ten. Her last name is never revealed during the series. Leonard and Penny date on and off throughout the series which is a big plot point of the show, they eventually marry and find out they're pregnant in the series finale. 

Penny makes a brief non-speaking cameo as a child in the Season 2 finale of Young Sheldon, she was portrayed by Quinn Aune as a child.

Howard

Howard Joel Wolowitz, M.Eng. (portrayed by Simon Helberg; seasons 1-12) is an aerospace engineer at Caltech's Department of Applied Physics who often hangs out at Leonard and Sheldon's apartment. Unlike Sheldon, Leonard, and Raj, Howard does not have a doctorate and often gets disparaged as a result, especially by Sheldon. He defends this by pointing out that he has a master's degree in Engineering from MIT and that the equipment he designs is launched into space, unlike the theoretical work of his friends. In the fifth-season finale, Howard goes to the International Space Station on Expedition 31.

Howard lives in Altadena with his domineering, belittling, and unseen mother, who treats him like a child. While he sometimes expresses irritation at this treatment, for the most part, he appears to prefer it. Howard and his mother often communicate with each other from different rooms by yelling, a habit which Bernadette also adopts in later episodes. Howard fancies himself a ladies' man and attempts pick-up lines whenever a woman is present, although he drops this habit once he starts going out with Bernadette. He is a non-observant Jew. Over the course of the series, he and Bernadette marry and have two children. 

In the pilot episode, he speaks English, French, Mandarin, Russian, Arabic, and Persian, along with fictional languages like Klingon and Sindarin. Howard suffers from asthma, transient idiopathic arrhythmia, allergies to peanuts, almonds, and walnuts, and is prone to canker sores and pink eye.

Howard makes a brief, non-speaking appearance in the Season 2 finale of Young Sheldon, in which he is portrayed as a child by Ethan Stern.

Raj

Rajesh Ramayan Koothrappali, PhD (portrayed by Kunal Nayyar; seasons 1-12) is Howard Wolowitz's best friend. Often called "Raj" by his friends, he is from New Delhi, India, and works in the physics department at Caltech, researching astroparticle physics. Raj comes from a very wealthy family in India, and often communicates with his parents, Dr. and Mrs. Koothrappali, via webcam. Like most of the scientists bar Howard he also has a PHD.  He has a younger sister, Priya. He lives in an apartment in Pasadena. As with his friends, he is mutually involved with and obsessed with science fiction and comic books in general. He is also a fan of Harry Potter and Indian music, but appreciates the Indian lullabies his mother sang and the catchiness of Hindi phrases. Unlike his male friends, Raj has many feminine interests, such as reading Archie comics and Twilight and watching chick flicks such as Bridget Jones's Diary. It is speculated that Raj might be gay due to his feminine interests and his close friendship with Howard, with whom he has arguments similar to those of a married couple. However, Raj has always stated that he is straight, but metrosexual. He was infatuated with Penny, and secretly wrote love poems about Bernadette. 

Raj is a Hindu and believes in karma (reincarnation), but eats beef. He is very shy around women outside of his family, and during the first six seasons of the show, found himself unable to speak to women while in their presence unless he drank alcoholic beverages, or believed he had done so. He eventually is able to get over this condition and starts to, unsuccessfully and for short periods, date women. 

Raj makes a brief non-speaking cameo as a child in the Season 2 finale of Young Sheldon, he was portrayed by Rishabh Prabhat as a child.

Leslie

Leslie Winkle, PhD (portrayed by Sara Gilbert; main: season 2; recurring: season 1; guest: seasons 3 & 9) is an experimental physicist who shares her lab with Leonard. In appearance, she is essentially Leonard's female counterpart, equipped with black-framed glasses and sweat jackets. She suffers from lazy eye. She is one of Sheldon's archenemies due to their conflicting scientific ideas and takes every opportunity to insult Sheldon for mistreating her.

Bernadette Maryann Rostenkowski-Wolowitz 

Bernadette Maryann Rostenkowski-Wolowitz, PhD (portrayed by Melissa Rauch; main: seasons 4-12; recurring: season 3) is originally a waitress and co-worker of Penny's at The Cheesecake Factory, using her wages to pay for her graduate studies in Microbiology. She is a smart, short-tempered, ruthless, competitive young woman. Despite her short stature and squeaky voice, she is regarded as being intimidating, largely because of her sharp tongue, aggressive demeanor and tendency to be a bully. A recurring joke in the series references Bernadette and her lab team handling dangerous or infectious specimens, leading to accidental byproducts. 

While initially not getting along with Howard’s mother, she eventually becomes like her, domineering and passive aggressive, even adopting her signature yell. 

She and Howard have two children, Halley and Neil Michael (who they call Michael), in seasons 10 and 11 respectively. 

Bernadette is of Polish origin and Catholic upbringing, and was originally seen wearing a cross necklace.  

Bernadette makes a brief non-speaking cameo as a child in the Season 2 finale of Young Sheldon, she was portrayed by A. J. Coggeshall as a child.

Amy

Amy Farrah Fowler, PhD (portrayed by Mayim Bialik PhD; main: seasons 4-12; guest: season 3) is a neuroscientist with a research focus on addiction in primates and invertebrates, occasionally mentioning such experiments involving addiction. (Bialik herself has a PhD in neuroscience.) She is Sheldon's love interest in the series, and they marry at the end of season 11. They are revealed to have children in Young Sheldon. 

Early on, Amy is essentially a female counterpart to Sheldon, but later on, she begins a campaign to increase Sheldon's feelings for her by becoming more involved in his interests, including video games and Star Trek, and treating him as his mother did. 

In 2020, a year after The Big Bang Theory went off the air, it was revealed that Kate Micucci, who ultimately got the role of Lucy, had auditioned for the role of Amy Farrah Fowler.

Amy makes two appearances in Young Sheldon. She makes an appearance as a child in the Season 2 finale where she is portrayed in a non-speaking role by Lily Sanfelippo. Bialik returns to play Amy in the narration of the season 4 premiere.

Stuart

Stuart David Bloom (portrayed by Kevin Sussman; main: seasons 6 & 8-12; recurring: seasons 2-5 & 7) runs the Comic Center in Pasadena, the comic book store that the characters often visit. Stuart is characterized by his low self-esteem and loneliness, which often result in pathetic attempts to engage with women and win favor with the gang. This is despite owning his own business and being a talented portraiture artist who attended the Rhode Island School of Design.

One of the running gags on the show is Stuart’s medical situation. It is depicted as disastrous, so much so that he can be seen under various medical treatments. He is said to have depression and possible malnutrition, among other problems. 
In the last season, Stuart’s life seems to be turning around. His comic store becomes successful and he gets a steady, long-term relationship. 

Kevin Sussman was a recurring guest actor from seasons two to five, and was promoted to starring role for the sixth season onwards.

Emily Sweeney
Emily Sweeney, M.D., (portrayed by Laura Spencer; main: season 9; recurring: seasons 7-8; guest: season 10) is a dermatology resident at Huntington Hospital, whom Raj finds on an online dating site. Raj enlists Amy’s help to be his “online wingman” and talk to Emily in his behalf. Amy tells Emily about this and it puts her off. Amy and Emily end up hitting it off, having both gone to Harvard and both being into quilting. While Amy and Emily are at lunch together, Raj crashes the lunch. This drives Emily away from both Raj and Amy this time. Later, Raj and Emily meet again, accidentally and hit it off. They eventually double date with Howard and Bernadette, which horrifies Howard. He and Emily had a horrible date, which ended because Howard had gas station sushi, got food poisoning and clogged and overflowed her toilet. Emily is not afraid to stand up for herself or to others when necessary. She is shown to have a slightly alarming personality trait: she delights in the macabre.
Raj ends up breaking up with her before  Valentine’s Day so he could be with Claire (Alessandra Olivia Toreson). Unfortunately for Raj, Claire had just gotten back together with her boyfriend. So, he eventually lost them both. Emily attempted to get back into Raj’s good graces and did manage to sleep with him one last time, but it didn’t last. 

Laura Spencer was a recurring guest actress on the series in seasons seven and eight. During production of season 9, she was promoted to a "fractional" starring role; the upgraded status ensured her availability on an as-needed basis, without requiring her in every episode. She returned as a guest in season 10.

Young Sheldon main characters

Sheldon Lee Cooper
Sheldon Lee Cooper (portrayed by Iain Armitage; seasons 1-present) is a child prodigy who finishes primary school before his twin sister, Missy, and joins the same high-school class as his older brother, Georgie, at the age of nine. He reads widely and possesses an eidetic memory. He prefers to learn topics that interest him on his own—such as Faraday's law of induction and gravitational lensing—than the standard curriculum of grade school. In this series, the origins of his interests in the sciences, engineering, computers, trains, comic books, and science fiction (especially the character Spock from Star Trek) are revealed. Sheldon moves on to college while Missy remains in middle school. Despite their rivalry, Sheldon and Missy are closer than they first appear.

Mary Cooper
Mary Cooper (née Tucker) (portrayed by Laurie Metcalf in The Big Bang Theory; recurring: seasons 7 & 9-12; guest: seasons 1 & 3-5 and by Zoe Perry in Young Sheldon; seasons 1-present) is Sheldon's loving and deeply religious mother from Texas. She is able to control Sheldon, with Leonard once describing her to Penny as "Sheldon's kryptonite". A devout Southern Baptist, she also has two other children — Sheldon's twin sister, Missy, and brother, Georgie, who is five years older than the twins. Her husband, a rambunctious alcoholic, was also named George, but he later died in Sheldon's childhood. To Mary's relief, her other children do not share Sheldon's precociousness, even once commenting to Leonard, "I thank the good Lord my other kids are as dumb as soup". Mary herself is not intellectual but is quite wise, though she is prone to making outdated and insensitive remarks. She is nevertheless kind at heart and is tolerant of other faiths. Leonard wishes his mother were as loving as Sheldon's mother, although Sheldon himself appears at best ambivalent about her parenting. Sheldon mentions that Mary once hit him with a Bible because he refused to eat his Brussels sprouts. She apparently thought something was wrong with her son while he was growing up since Sheldon will often remark after someone calls him crazy, "I'm not crazy; my mother had me tested!" Mary confirms this, though she wishes that she had taken him to Houston for further testing.

A younger version of Mary is a main character in the prequel series Young Sheldon. Perry is Metcalf's real life daughter.

George Cooper Sr.
George Cooper Sr. is the father of Georgie, Sheldon, and Missy and the husband of Mary Tucker-Cooper. In The Big Bang Theory, it is established that he died when Sheldon and Missy were fourteen years old. He is portrayed by Lance Barber (seasons 1-present), who previously portrayed Jimmy Speckerman in one episode of The Big Bang Theory (guest: season 5). George works as a football coach.

George "Georgie" Marshall Cooper Jr.
George "Georgie" Cooper Jr. (portrayed by Jerry O'Connell as an adult; recurring: seasons 11-12 and Montana Jordan as a youth; seasons 1-present) is Sheldon and Missy's older brother who resides in Texas and runs a car tire business. Often at odds while growing up, the Cooper brothers later reconcile their differences. George Jr. is a laid-back character who likes to make money. By season 12 of The Big Bang Theory, it is revealed that he has been twice married and divorced.

Melissa "Missy" Cooper
 (Courtney Henggeler as an adult; guest: seasons 1 & 7 & 11 and Raegan Revord as a child; seasons 1-present) is not as academically accomplished as her twin brother but displays better social skills. In season three of Young Sheldon, Missy joins the baseball team in the fictional town of Medford. While Sheldon finishes high school and matriculates at university, Missy navigates the ordinary challenges of adolescence. Despite their differences, the twins are pretty close; they are both atheists.

As an adult in The Big Bang Theory, Missy is a tall, attractive woman who promptly catches the attention of Leonard, Howard, and Raj. She occasionally visits Sheldon, whom she calls a "rocket scientist" to her friends, much to his annoyance.

Constance "Connie" Tucker ("Meemaw")

Constance "Connie" Tucker (June Squibb in The Big Bang Theory; guest: season 9 and Annie Potts in Young Sheldon; seasons 1-present) is Mary's mother, George Sr.'s mother-in-law, and maternal grandmother to Georgie, Sheldon, and Missy, who call her "Meemaw". Like Sheldon's other family members, she is also native to Texas and is their next-door neighbor in the town of Medford. Sheldon sees himself as her favorite grandchild, whom she affectionately calls "Moonpie". Sheldon, in turn, is very affectionate toward and protective of her. Meemaw is often mentioned by Sheldon but did not appear on the series until episode 14 of season nine, "The Meemaw Manifestation".

In Young Sheldon, a recurring theme is her significant gambling habit.

Pastor Jeff Difford
Pastor Jeff Difford (portrayed by Matt Hobby; main: seasons 3-present; recurring: seasons 1-2) is the upbeat lead pastor of a local Baptist church in Medford that Sheldon's family attends in Young Sheldon. Like Mary, he, too, sometimes has friction with Sheldon's atheistic side but often recommends Sheldon explore his own ideas logically.

Billy Sparks
Billy Sparks (portrayed by Wyatt McLure; main: seasons 5-present; recurring: seasons 1-4) is a boy who lives with his parents and sister next to the Coopers and Meemaw. He has been mentioned in The Big Bang Theory as one of Sheldon's childhood bullies, although in Young Sheldon, he is rather good-natured and at times is friends with Sheldon but is shown to be extremely dim-witted.

Supporting characters
The following list is sorted in alphabetical order by first name:

Cast table
  = Recurring cast (2+ episodes)
  = Guest cast (1 episode)

The Big Bang Theory

Alex Jensen 

Alex Jensen (Margo Harshman) is a Caltech graduate student who appears in season six. Sheldon hires her to review his kindergarten and elementary-school notebooks for any possible Nobel Prize-winning research and attend to the tasks that Sheldon perceives as a waste of his own valuable time, such as buying Amy a Valentine's Day gift.

Alex takes an interest in pursuing a relationship with Leonard (despite his involvement with Penny), though he is oblivious to her romantic overtures. After she asks him out on a date, to which Leonard is flattered and Penny is jealous, Sheldon views this as an unacceptable distraction from her job. Alex files a harassment complaint against Sheldon after he attempts to give her a "talking to" involving unthinkingly sexist language and showing her a picture book of sexually diseased genitals. After Sheldon apologizes to Alex for his behavior, he tasks her with taking an online sexual harassment course he was mandated to take by the Human Resources department.

Anu 
Anu (Rati Gupta) is the woman with whom Raj's father wants him to marry. She first appears in season 12. She works in a hotel as a concierge.

Arthur Jeffries 

Arthur Jeffries, or Professor Proton (Bob Newhart), is the star of a fictional in-universe science show that Sheldon and Leonard watched as children. The character is a homage to Mr. Wizard. After the show was cancelled, Jeffries was not taken seriously as a scientist and resorted to doing children's parties as his persona. When Sheldon asks for his wisdom, Jeffries tells Sheldon to appreciate everything in life, including his friends, and never take it for granted.

For his role as Jeffries, in 2013, Newhart won his first Primetime Emmy Award. Newhart plays the same character on Young Sheldon.

Barry Kripke 

Barry Kripke, PhD (John Ross Bowie) is a colleague working in plasma physics who frequently clashes with Sheldon. Kripke has a case of rhotacism in which he pronounces the letters "R" and "L" as "W" in much the same way as Elmer Fudd from Looney Tunes, Jimmy Five from Monica's Gang and Gilda Radner in her "Baba Wawa" sketches.

Bert Kibbler 

Professor Bertram Kibbler (Brian Posehn) is a geologist at Caltech, who met Amy while she was working there in her own lab in "The Occupation Recalibration". He made various other appearances, including forming a band with Raj and Howard in which he sang a song from the point of view of the boulder seen near the beginning of the movie Raiders of the Lost Ark. After Raj stopped accepting his father's money to become financially independent, he moved into the room above Bert's garage.

Beverly Hofstadter 

Beverly Hofstadter (Christine Baranski) is Leonard's unloving and overly analytical mother who works as a neuroscientist, as well as a psychiatrist. She is Sheldon's female equivalent regarding neurotically strict speech patterns, disregard for social conventions, and compulsive attention to detail. The lack of Beverly's maternal feelings and actions toward Leonard has led to him having an obsessive need to please. Mrs. Hofstadter and Mrs. Cooper do not get along.

For her role as Beverly, in both 2009 and 2010, Baranski was nominated for an Emmy Award for Outstanding Guest Actress in a Comedy Series.

Claire 

Claire (Alessandra Torresani) is a writer for a children's science fiction series whom Raj and Howard meet in the comic book store in season 9. Claire wants to collaborate with Raj on the science portions of a movie script.

Dan 

Dan (Stephen Root) is a senior member of staff at Zangen, who first appears in "The Locomotion Interruption" when he interviews Penny for a pharmaceutical sales representative position as a favor to Bernadette.

Dave Gibbs 

Dave Gibbs (Stephen Merchant) is a tall British man who dates Amy after she breaks up with Sheldon. He is recently divorced, his wife having had an affair with a French chef, which he remains bitter over. To Amy's horror, he is an avid fan of Sheldon's work, constantly asking questions about him after learning that he and Amy dated.

Denise 

Denise (Lauren Lapkus) is the assistant manager at Stuart's comic book store introduced in season 10. She is quite a comic book geek. At first, Sheldon does not like the change that her hiring brings to the store but starts to like her because of her comic book knowledge and her ability to figure out his preferences in comic books. By Season 12, she and Stuart enter into a relationship after he takes her as his plus-one to Sheldon and Amy's wedding.

Eric Gablehauser 
Eric Gablehauser (Mark Harelik) is the head of the Physics Department, making him the boss of the guys. Gablehauser later hosts the Physics Bowl, and gives Raj attention when he is featured in a People article for discovering a planet.

V. M. Koothrappali 

V. M. Koothrappali (Brian George) is Raj's father in India. His wife and he communicate with their son via Skype and constantly try to arrange dates for him. They want their son to marry a woman of Indian descent and give them grandchildren.

Mrs. Koothrappali 

Mrs. Koothrappali (Alice Amter) is Raj's mother in India. Mrs. Koothrappali is especially worried that, despite Raj being old enough to marry, the closest they have to a daughter-in-law is "that little Jewish boy Howard".

Janine Davis 

Janine Davis (Regina King) is a human resources representative working at the university. She first appears in season six after Sheldon offends his assistant Alex while trying to deal with her crush on Leonard, leaving Mrs. Davis to handle Alex's sexual harassment complaint against Sheldon. When a tenured position is made available, she is pestered by Leonard, Sheldon, and Raj and wooed by Kripke.

Kurt 
Kurt (Brian Patrick Wade) is a tall, intimidating bodybuilder and Penny's ex-boyfriend at the beginning of the series.

Lucy 

Lucy (Kate Micucci) shows up at a party at the comic-book store on Valentine's Day at an event for people who had no dates. She has social anxiety issues, which allows Raj and her to connect.

Originally, Kate Micucci had been one of the actresses considered for the Amy Farrah Fowler character.

Mike Rostenkowski 
Mike Rostenkowski (Casey Sander) is Bernadette's father and a retired police officer. Mike has a rough and rude personality and often bullies others, although he deeply loves his daughter, calling Bernadette his "little girl". Before he is first seen, Bernadette establishes his personality by telling Howard a long list of subjects he cannot discuss with Mike, including Jimmy Carter, foreigners, homosexuals, and even Howard's Jewish identity. Mike oddly enough gets on very well with Sheldon, filling a role in his life vacated by his deceased father, George.

President Siebert 

President Siebert (Joshua Malina) is the president of the California Institute of Technology. Often mentioned by Sheldon, a recurring gag is that Sheldon often calls or visits Siebert in the middle of the night to get information and usually gets a bitter response. In season eleven, the president returns to support Sheldon and Amy's work in physics.

Priya Koothrappali 
Priya Koothrappali (Aarti Mann) is Raj's younger sister. Having graduated at the top of her class at the University of Cambridge (where, like Leonard, her roommate was from Texas), she is one of the lead attorneys at India's biggest car company. Leonard and Priya date for much of season 4 and part of 5 when she moves to Los Angeles, but break up when Priya moves back to India and cheats on Leonard.

Ramona Nowitzki 

Ramona Nowitzki, Ph.D. (Riki Lindhome) first appears in the season 2 episode "The Cooper–Nowitzki Theorem", when she is a graduate student at Caltech who is a huge fan of Sheldon's work and develops a crush on him.

Ruchi 
Ruchi (Swati Kapila) is a new co-worker of Bernadette's at Zangen who first appears in season 11. Ruchi used to live in India, and was in an arranged engagement, until she broke off the engagement and moved to America.

Wil Wheaton 

Wil Wheaton plays a fictionalized version of himself. Wil played Wesley Crusher in Star Trek: The Next Generation, a character that Sheldon idolized as a child. In 1995, Wheaton made Sheldon's "mortal enemy" list after the former failed to show up at a fan convention. Sheldon took a 10-hour bus ride to attend the convention and was disappointed that Wheaton was a no-show.

Wil Wheaton, LeVar Burton, Leonard Nimoy (in voice-over only), Brent Spiner, William Shatner and George Takei have all appeared on the show, making the Star Trek franchise the most represented franchise on the show in terms of guest appearances.

Marissa Johnson 
Marissa Johnson (Lindsey Kraft) is married to Penny's ex-boyfriend, Zack Johnson. They meet with Leonard and Penny and they want Leonard to father their child since Zack is infertile.

Mrs. Wolowitz 
Mrs. Debbie Malvina Wolowitz (voiced by Carol Ann Susi) is Howard's over-protective, controlling, belittling, but loving and caring stereotypical Jewish mother. The character is not shown on-screen with only two exceptions: firstly in one episode in season six where her body but not her face is briefly shown, and secondly in the Season 5 finale where she can be seen (albeit very small) in the Google Earth satellite picture taken during Howard and Bernadette's wedding. Mrs. Wolowitz's raspy voice is heard usually in scenes at her house, which she shares with Howard. She talks to Howard always by yelling at him from another room, which results in awkward conversations with Howard yelling back at her. In a flashback, when the guys hear her yelling in a masculine voice, they ask Howard if that was his father, to which Howard replies, "If she grows any more hair on her face, yes." Mrs. Wolowitz is also described as being enormously obese and wearing a wig and painted-on eyebrows. She seems to be oblivious to Howard's work as an engineer and treats him as though he is still a child. She is a master at Wheel of Fortune and guessing answers at game shows. She frequently refers to Leonard, Sheldon, and Raj as Howard's "little friends" (as in, "I made some cookies and Hawaiian Punch for you and your little friends!") and often refers to Caltech as a "school". Howard often makes references to his mother as being a "crazy old lady", but deep down he is deeply attached to her and quite happy to be treated like a child. She is also noted to be on hormone replacement therapy, and she wants to "play doctor" with Raj when he asks to sleep over.

Wyatt 

Wyatt (Keith Carradine) is Penny's father. He comes to visit, and Penny feels compelled to involve Leonard in a ruse to make him think they are still together. (Wyatt reveals that he favors the successful Leonard over Penny's other "loser" boyfriends.)

Zack Johnson 
Zack Johnson (Brian Thomas Smith) is a dim-witted but friendly beefcake type whom Penny dates on and off after her second break-up with Leonard. He takes a lively interest in the boys' scientific exploits, but sometimes (and much to Penny's disgust) becomes the butt of their jokes.

Zack works as the menu designer for restaurants that are owned by or which have hired his father's company to design their menus. Later, Penny and Zach go out to a party, but she is so put off at how stupid he is that she runs back to Leonard for sex, saying he ruined her ability to tolerate stupid men. In season four, Zack runs into Penny, Bernadette, and Amy at a restaurant, and Amy becomes physically attracted to him. Sheldon arranges a meeting between Zack and Amy to satisfy her "urges", but his lack of intellect immediately discourages Amy. 

Later, Penny runs into Zack again after he buys her, Bernadette and Amy drinks. He reveals that he has sold his menu company and become rich from the profits, and invites her and Leonard to dinner at his yacht with him and his new wife, Marissa Johnson.

Young Sheldon

Brenda Sparks 
Brenda Sparks (Melissa Peterman) is Billy Sparks's mother who works at the bowling alley frequented by Meemaw. She frequently clashes with Mary due to her religious status.

Dale Ballard 
Coach Dale Ballard (Craig T. Nelson) is the owner of a sporting goods store and a part-time baseball coach who lets Missy play after he declined but Meemaw intervened. He also ends up dating Meemaw after her breakup with Dr. Sturgis.

Dr. John Sturgis 
Dr. John Sturgis (Wallace Shawn) is a physics professor at the university East Texas Tech, which Sheldon attends part-time. Dr. Sturgis is initially a pen pal of Sheldon Cooper before the child prodigy audits his course on quantum chromodynamics. Dr. Sturgis is instantly smitten with Sheldon's grandmother, and they begin dating. He is also rather childish like going to bed at 7:30 and asking Meemaw's permission to do things as if she were his mother.

Herschel Sparks 
Herschel Sparks (Billy Gardell) is a neighbor of the Cooper family and Meemaw, the husband of Brenda Sparks, and the father of Billy and Bobbi Sparks. He runs his own garage, where he offers Georgie a part-time job. Georgie turns out to be a wonderful employee, something that makes George and Herschel happy and stunned. Herschel is often bossed around by his wife, something that he and George bond over since George is often bossed around by Mary as well. In the fourth season, he and Brenda get a divorce.

Paige 
Paige Swanson (Mckenna Grace) is a 10-year-old child prodigy whom Sheldon meets in one of his classes with Dr. Sturgis. As his rival, she teases him about differentiating under the integral sign. She has higher social skills than Sheldon and is capable of being friends with nonintellectuals. She reacts negatively to her parents' divorce. Dr. Sturgis advises Sheldon to listen to her problems. He does, which results in Sheldon learning to listen. He attempts to console her by making her a hot beverage.

Robin 
Robin (Mary Grill) is a police officer and Pastor Jeff’s second wife. Pastor Jeff meets Robin in “A Broken Heart and a Crock Monster” when she stops him for passing a red light. She takes an interest in him and because of that, refuses to give him a ticket.

Tam Nguyen 
Tam Nguyen (Ryan Phuong – YS / Robert Wu – TBBT) is a Vietnamese-American Catholic boy who, in Young Sheldon, is Sheldon's classmate and only friend. His father Le Nguyen, and mother Trang Nguyen, run a store called "Medford Mart". He has a troubled relationship with his parents, having been treated badly by both of them after moving to the United States. He has two sisters, Mai and Kim-Ly, with whom he has a good relationship. Tam laments his difficult childhood in war-torn Vietnam, which included his father being incarcerated in a re-education camp to "become a good communist", and his encounter with the Ku Klux Klan when he first arrived in America.

Veronica Duncan 
Veronica Duncan (Isabel May) is Georgie Cooper's most significant love interest on Young Sheldon. Initially introduced as a popular and "easy" girl, Veronica becomes a devout Christian after going through a "Hell house" one Halloween. Georgie is obsessed with her and frequently takes every advantage he can to be close to her or impress her in any way.

Minor characters 

 Dr. Alfred Hofstadter (Judd Hirsch): Leonard's father, an anthropologist who once worked with famed archaeologist Louis Leakey. (Leonard's middle name is Leakey in consequence.) He was miserable in his marriage to Leonard's mother Beverly.
  (Vernee Watson): makes an appearance in the pilot episode as an attendant at a sperm bank, and then makes three appearances as an emergency room nurse in "The Peanut Reaction" episode (season one) and "The Robotic Manipulation" episode (season four), and as a ward nurse in "The Werewolf Transformation" (season five). The name of the character is never used on the show, but is included on her name tag and in the credits. She is also the only character besides Leonard and Sheldon to be carried over from the original unaired pilot. Watson also portrays a younger version of Robinson in several episodes of Young Sheldon.
 Dr. Stephanie Barnett (Sara Rue): a medical doctor and a highly distinguished surgeon that Howard tries to seduce, but she falls for Leonard. She dates Leonard and surreptitiously moves in with him. Once Sheldon and Penny point this out to him, Leonard breaks up with her.
 Captain Sweatpants (Ian Scott Rudolph) and Lonely Larry (Owen Thayer): sometimes seen at the guys' favorite comic-book store. Captain Sweatpants is a middle-aged bald man who wears grey sweatpants and a T-shirt with Captain America's shield. Lonely Larry wears a brown suit and is extremely thin. They are also friends with Wil Wheaton. Both attend Howard's bachelor party.
 Cheryl (Erin Allin O'Reilly), an attendee at Penny's Halloween party in season one, episode six, "The Middle-Earth Paradigm". Cheryl is the very talkative, short-haired brunette dressed as a ladybug, who shows interest in Raj. She is not identified within the episode, but her name is listed in the credits. She appears again as a Cheesecake Factory waitress in "The Pancake Batter Anomaly".
 Dale (Josh Brener), a replacement for Stuart at the comic-book store when Stuart goes on a date with Amy in "The Flaming Spittoon Acquisition". Also appears in "The Tangible Affection Proof" at Stuart's Valentine's Day party.
 Mrs. Fowler (Annie O'Donnell (Season 5); Kathy Bates (Seasons 11 and 12)): Amy Fowler's mother.
 Dimitri Rezinov (Pasha Lychnikoff), a Russian cosmonaut who is Howard's colleague on his Soyuz mission to the International Space Station.
 Dr. David Underhill (Michael Trucco), a MacArthur Grant recipient and a successful physicist in the episode "The Bath Item Gift Hypothesis"
 Jeanie (Kara Luiz) is the second-cousin with whom Howard lost his virginity in a Toyota Corolla after his Uncle Murray Wolowitz’s funeral. Jeanie is mentioned by Howard in The Creepy Candy Corollary and The Adhesive Duck Deficiency (both episodes in Season 3) but appears for the first and only time in The Prom Equivalency (Season 8) as Stuart’s date.
 Halley Wolowitz (Pamela Adlon, voice only), Howard and Bernadette's baby daughter, born in the episode "The Birthday Synchronicity".
 Neil Michael Wolowitz, Howard and Bernadette's baby son, born in the episode "The Neonatal Nomenclature".

Guest stars

The Big Bang Theory 

 Abby (Danica McKellar) and Martha (Jen Drohan): two women whom  Raj and Sheldon meet at a university mixer. Abby takes a liking to Raj, and Martha takes a liking to Sheldon. While Raj is welcoming of Abby's moves, Sheldon rejects Martha.
 Alice (Courtney Ford): an attractive comic book enthusiast whom Leonard meets after Priya moves back to India. Meeting Alice triggers a chain of events which ends with Leonard and Priya splitting.
 Mandy Chao (Melissa Tang): a colleague of Leonard at the university who made out with him once when they were both drunk. The incident, which happened prior to Leonard's marriage to Penny, almost sabotages the marriages after Leonard tells Penny about it.
 Chen (James Hong): a maitre d' at a Chinese restaurant the guys regularly patronize.
 Professor Crawley (Lewis Black): a former entomologist at the university with whom Sheldon, Howard, and Raj confer about a cricket
 Issabella Maria Concepcion (Maria Canals-Barrera) a Cuban-American janitor working in Raj's telescope building whom Raj wants to date.
 Kenny Fitzgerald (Michael Rapaport): an intelligent thief who sells stolen liquid helium to Leonard and Sheldon. He later strikes up a friendship with the duo and they watch Ernest Goes to Jail together.
 Mr. Larry Fowler (Teller): Amy Fowler's father who is terrified of his wife.
 Dr. Gallo (Jane Kaczmarek): a therapist to whom Penny attempts to sell products. She winds up conducting therapy on both Penny and Leonard.
 Jesse (Josh Peck): the owner of the comic book store Capitol Comics and Stuart's rival.
 Mrs. Latham (Jessica Walter): a donor for the university who goes on two dates with Leonard.
 Toby Loobenfield (DJ Qualls): a scientist at Caltech whom Sheldon hires to play his fictional drug-addicted cousin Leo
 Dr. Oliver Lorvis (Billy Bob Thornton): a medical doctor to whom Penny sells products. He misreads her flirtations and locks the guys in his basement while he goes to woo her (as well as Amy and Bernadette).
 Sunny Morrow (Ciara Renée): a newscaster who interviews Raj on the local news about an upcoming astronomical event.
 Octavia (Octavia Spencer): a DMV clerk with whom Sheldon interacts
 Agent Angela Page (Eliza Dushku): an FBI agent assigned to interview Howard's acquaintances to determine his eligibility to use the Defense Department Laser Equipped Surveillance Satellite team.
 Dr. Elizabeth Plimpton (Judy Greer): an acquaintance of Sheldon's, who, upon visiting, engages in sexual roleplay with Leonard, Howard, and Raj
 Randall (Jack McBrayer): Penny's brother who first appears in the season 10 premiere "The Conjugal Conjecture" when he attends his sister's re-wedding to Leonard. He has served several prison terms and had several other "troubles" over the years.
 Sandy (Yeardley Smith): interviewing clerk at a job center when Sheldon tries to find a menial part-time job to clear his head
 Jimmy Speckerman (Lance Barber), a former high school classmate of Leonard who used to bully Leonard during their high school days on a regular basis. He comes to visit with Leonard, not realizing that his actions in high school constituted bullying. In the prequel series, Young Sheldon, and in "The VCR Illumination", Barber plays Sheldon's father, George Cooper, Sr.
 Spock (Leonard Nimoy, voice only): appears in Sheldon's dream
 Susan (Katey Sagal): Penny's mother who first appears in the season 10 premiere "The Conjugal Conjecture" when she attends her daughter's re-wedding to Leonard. Sagal and Cuoco previously appeared in the main cast of 8 Simple Rules for Dating My Teenage Daughter. Sagal plays Cuoco's mother in that series as well.
 Trevor (Blake Anderson): an individual with whom Sheldon has conflict when he cuts in front of them at the movie theater
 Josh Wolowitz (Matt Bennett): Howard's half brother.
 Theodore (Christopher Lloyd): An old man to whom Sheldon rents his room in "The Property Division Collision". However, the rental is apparently for one night only since he soon leaves and is never seen again.
 Sebastian (Steven Yeun): Sheldon's roommate before Leonard who was intolerant toward Sheldon's behavior in "The Staircase Implementation". He also warned Leonard to "Run away, dude". His intolerance of Sheldon becomes apparent when Leonard enters Sebastian's former room and sees the phrase "DIE SHELDON, DIE" written on the wall in red paint.
 Tam Nguyen (Robert Wu): a childhood friend of Sheldon who comes to visit Caltech and meets Sheldon after 20 years of separation
 Dr. Greg Pemberton (Sean Astin) and Dr. Campbell (Kal Penn): two physicists who prove Sheldon and Amy's super asymmetry theory and try to intervene in their Nobel Prize nomination

Young Sheldon 

 Anjelika Washington as Libby, an eleventh grader who aspires to be a geologist and whom Sheldon and Tam befriend
 Mayim Bialik as Amy Farrah Fowler, Sheldon's future lover and wife. This role is reprised from The Big Bang Theory. She appears as part of the narration.
 Melanie Lynskey as Professor Dora Ericson, who teaches Sheldon philosophy in college
 Ming-Na Wen as Dr. Carol Lee, a cosmologist from UC Berkeley brought in to lead a project that Sheldon, Dr. Sturgis, and Dr. Linkletter are working on

Guest stars appearing as themselves 
Various Hollywood celebrities and famous scientists and engineers have made appearances on the show as themselves. In most cases, the appearances are brief cameo appearances. These appearances are in contrast to Wil Wheaton who, as described above, plays a character on the show which is a fictionalized version of himself.

The Big Bang Theory
 Kareem Abdul-Jabbar: "The D&D Vortex"
 Buzz Aldrin: "The Holographic Excitation"
 Frances Arnold: "The Laureate Accumulation" (12th season)
 LeVar Burton: "The Toast Derivation", "The Habitation Configuration", "The Champagne Reflection"
 Ellen DeGeneres: "The Geology Elevation", "The Laureate Accumulation"
 Nathan Fillion: "The Comic Book Store Regeneration"
 Carrie Fisher: "The Convention Conundrum"
 Ira Flatow: "The Vengeance Formulation" (voice only), "The Discovery Dissipation", "The Retraction Reaction"
 Neil Gaiman: "The Comet Polarization"
 Bill Gates: "The Gates Excitation"
 Sarah Michelle Gellar: "The Stockholm Syndrome"
 Summer Glau: "The Terminator Decoupling"
 Brian Greene: "The Herb Garden Germination"
 Mark Hamill: "The Bow Tie Asymmetry"
 Stephen Hawking: "The Hawking Excitation", "The Extract Obliteration", "The Relationship Diremption", "The Troll Manifestation", "The Celebration Experimentation", "The Geology Elevation", "The Proposal Proposal"
 James Earl Jones: "The Convention Conundrum"
 Stan Lee: "The Excelsior Acquisition"
 Howie Mandel: "The Re-Entry Minimization"
 Joe Manganiello: "The D&D Vortex"
 Mike Massimino: "The Friendship Contraction", "The Countdown Reflection", "The Decoupling Fluctuation", "The Re-Entry Minimization", "The Table Polarization", "The First Pitch Insufficiency"
 Elon Musk: "The Platonic Permutation"
 Adam Nimoy: "The Spock Resonance"
 Bill Nye: "The Proton Displacement", "The Conjugal Configuration"
 Samantha Potter: "The Panty Piñata Polarization"
 Katee Sackhoff: "The Vengeance Formulation", "The Hot Troll Deviation" (both appearances are in a daydream scene)
 William Shatner: "The D&D Vortex"
 Charlie Sheen: "The Griffin Equivalency"
 Kevin Smith: "The Fortification Implementation", "The D&D Vortex"
 George Smoot: "The Terminator Decoupling"
 Brent Spiner: "The Russian Rocket Reaction"
 George Takei: "The Hot Troll Deviation" (appears in a daydream scene)
 Kip Thorne: "The Laureate Accumulation"
 Analeigh Tipton: "The Panty Piñata Polarization"
 Neil deGrasse Tyson: "The Apology Insufficiency", "The Conjugal Configuration"
 Adam West: "The Celebration Experimentation"
 Steve Wozniak: "The Cruciferous Vegetable Amplification"

Young Sheldon
 David Hasselhoff: "Cowboy Aerobics and 473 Grease-Free Bolts"
 Stephen Hawking: "The Grand Chancellor and a Den of Sin" (voice only)
 Cyndi Lauper: "A Baby Tooth and the Egyptian God of Knowledge" (voice only, saying the words of the title of her song, "girls just want to have fun")
 Elon Musk:  "A Patch, a Modem, and a Zantac®" in a flashforward scene set 27 years into the future.

Notes

References

External links 
 

Lists of American sitcom television characters